Istrianis nigrosquamella is a moth of the family Gelechiidae. It is found in Iran.

The wingspan is 10.5–11 mm. Adults are similar to Istrianis squamodorella.

References

External links

 

Moths described in 1959
Istrianis